St Julian's Pier is a pier in Saint Peter Port Harbour, Guernsey.

The pier runs from the base of St Julian's Avenue, where a roundabout is now located, eastwards.

The cambridge berth is a later construction built at right angles to the pier, in a southerly direction as is the New Jetty and at the eastern extremity, the White Rock Pier.

To the north of the pier is the Queen Elizabeth II marina.

Monuments and memorials

The pier has a number of monuments and memorials

 50th Anniversary liberation monument in the form of a large obelisk and sundial.
 Liberation stone
 Plaque commemorating the evacuation of children and adults ahead of the Occupation of the Island by German forces in June 1940
 Plaque to victims of the Holocaust
 Plaque to remember the Deportees
 Harbour bombing memorial
 Plaque to remember the Foreign Workers 
 Guernsey Resistance plaque

References

Saint Peter Port
Piers in the United Kingdom